William Michael Berry, Baron Hartwell MBE (18 May 1911 – 3 April 2001), was a British newspaper proprietor and journalist.

Life and career
Berry was the second son of Mary Agnes (Corns) and William Berry, 1st Viscount Camrose, and was educated at Eton and Christ Church, Oxford.

Berry followed his brother Seymour Berry, 2nd Viscount Camrose, as Chairman and Editor-in-Chief of the Daily and Sunday Telegraph newspapers. He remained in this role until the takeover by Conrad Black in 1986. He was also the backer behind the arts review, X magazine.

Berry was awarded a life peerage as Baron Hartwell, of Peterborough Court in the City of London on 19 January 1968.  He succeeded his elder brother as 3rd Viscount Camrose in 1995, but disclaimed the title.

Marriage and family
Lord Hartwell married Lady Pamela Smith (1915–1982), daughter of F. E. Smith, 1st Earl of Birkenhead. They had four children together:

 Adrian Michael Berry, 4th Viscount Camrose (15 June 1937 - 18 April 2016)
 Hon. Nicholas William Berry (3 July 1942 - 25 December 2016)
 Hon. Harriet Mary Margaret Berry (born 8 November 1944)
 Hon. Eleanor Agnes Berry (born 6 May 1950)

Hartwell died in Westminster, London, aged 89 and was succeeded in the viscountcy, barony and baronetcy by his elder son.

References

Cowling, Maurice, The Impact of Hitler - British Policies and Policy 1933-1940, Cambridge University Press, 1975, p. 402,

External links

Deedes, ‘Berry, (William) Michael, Baron Hartwell (1911–2001)’, Oxford Dictionary of National Biography, online edn, Oxford University Press, Jan 2005; online edn, Oct 2005, accessed 11 Jan 2008

1911 births
2001 deaths
British male journalists
Crossbench life peers
Members of the Order of the British Empire
20th-century British newspaper publishers (people)
3
Alumni of Christ Church, Oxford
People educated at Eton College
City of London Yeomanry (Rough Riders) officers
Michael Berry
Younger sons of viscounts
Berry
Life peers created by Elizabeth II